David Eduard van Dijk (born 14 September 1925) is a Herpetologist and Paleontologist and author of a number of Biology textbooks.

Species named for him include the frog, Amietia vandijki (Van Dijk's river frog) (Visser & Channing)., first known only as tadpoles; the fossil plant bug, Australoprosoboloides vandijki (Riek); the plant fossil, "Estcourtia vandijki" (Anderson & Anderson) and the genus Vandijkophrynus (Van Dijk's toads)

Eddie has published in a number of fields including Zoology, Geology, Ichnology and Paleontology over a more than 65 year academic career, with the first, his M.Sc thesis in 1955 and most recently, publication of an article on Ichnology in 2021.

He has compiled bibliographies on African Anura (Frogs and Toads), African Tadpoles, African Fossil Frogs, and African Vertebrate Ichnology (Tracks and other Trace Fossils).

Education and career 
He attended school in Johannesburg and studied at the University of Witwatersrand and Johannesburg Teachers' Training College on a Transvaal Education Department Loan Bursary. He then went to Stellenbosch University where he obtained an MSc in 1953 and DSc in 1959. Somewhat more than a decade after his retirement, he undertook a second MSc (Palaeontology) at Stellenbosch University. This was awarded in 2000.

While repaying his Loan Bursary, he was a technician in the Bacteriology Laboratory of the South African Institute for Medical Research. Thereafter he lectured in the Zoology Department, University of Natal for approximately 30 years.

Awards and honours 

British Association Medal (Silver) (1955)
Junior Captain Scott Medal for Biology (1956)
Senior Captain Scott Medal for Biology (2010)

Selected publications 

 van Dijk, D.E. (1955). The "Tail" of Ascaphus. (M.Sc Thesis)
 
van Dijk, D.E., Eriksson, Patrick G. (2021). Bipedal leaping Jurassic vertebrates in Southern Africa: proposed new ichnotaxon and inferred palaeoenvironment. Transactions of the Royal Society of South Africa. 10.1080/0035919X.2021.1964104.

Books

Notes

References 
 Visser, J. and A. Channing. (1997). A new species of river frog from the Swartberg, South Africa (Ranidae: Afrana). Journal of African Zoology 111: 191–198.
 South African Journal of Science (December 1956). "Annual General Meeting of the South African Biological Society", South African Journal of Science, December 1956 (Pg 166).
 Southern African Association for the Advancement of Science. "List of award winners: British Association Medal (Silver)", http://s2a3.org.za/joomla/index.php/awards/british-association-medal-silver

External links
 ResearchGate

1925 births
Living people
University of the Witwatersrand alumni
Academic staff of the University of Natal
South African herpetologists
20th-century South African scientists
20th-century scientists
Stellenbosch University alumni